Project Highwater was an experiment carried out as part of two of the test flights of NASA's Saturn I launch vehicle (using battleship upper stages), successfully launched into a sub-orbital trajectory from Cape Canaveral, Florida. The Highwater experiment sought to determine the effect of a large volume of water suddenly released into the ionosphere. The project answered questions about the effect of the diffusion of propellants in the event that a rocket was destroyed at high altitude.

The first flight, SA-2, took place on April 25, 1962.

The second flight, SA-3, launched on November 16, 1962, and involved the same payload. For both of these experiments, the resulting ice clouds expanded to several miles in diameter and lightning-like radio disturbances were recorded.

See also 

High-altitude nuclear explosion - other high altitude explosive tests

References

Further reading
 

1962 in spaceflight
NASA programs
Military projects of the United States
Saturn (rocket family)
Water and the environment
Spacecraft launched by Saturn rockets